Mil-Lel  is a northern suburb of Mount Gambier.

The name for this suburb is believed to be a corruption of "Mullel", the name of a nearby waterhole. The name was historically written as two words: "Mil Lel" until the spelling was changed to "Mil-Lel" on 28 May 2009.

The 2016 Australian census which was conducted in August 2016 reports that Mil-Lel had a population of 368 people.

Mil Lel Post Office opened on 1 September 1899, was downgraded to a receiving office from October 1910 until being upgraded again on 1 July 1927, and closed on 30 June 1993.

Mil-Lel is located within the federal division of Barker, the state electoral district of Mount Gambier and the local government area of the District Council of Grant. It is also part of Mount Gambier’s urban sprawl.

References

Towns in South Australia
Limestone Coast